Devyn Jambga (born September 19, 1995) is an American-Zimbabwean retired soccer player who last played for South Georgia Tormenta in USL League One.

Career

College 
Jambga played college soccer at Southern Illinois University Edwardsville between 2013 and 2017, including a redshirted season in 2013. Jambga tallied 15 goals and 6 assists in 73 appearances for the Cougars.

While at college, Jambga appeared for Premier Development League side Des Moines Menace.

Professional 
Jambga signed with United Soccer League side Portland Timbers 2 on March 2, 2018.

Jambga announced his retirement from professional soccer on his Instagram on February 27, 2021.

Personal 
Jambga was born in St. Louis, Missouri in the United States, but grew up in Harare in Zimbabwe.

References

External links

1995 births
Living people
American soccer players
Association football forwards
Des Moines Menace players
Portland Timbers 2 players
FC Tucson players
Tormenta FC players
SIU Edwardsville Cougars men's soccer players
Soccer players from Missouri
Sportspeople from Harare
USL Championship players
USL League Two players
USL League One players